Norris Arm North is a local service district and designated place in the Canadian province of Newfoundland and Labrador. The place is also known as Alderburn. It was originally a fishing and farming settlement.

Geography 
Norris Arm North is in Newfoundland within Subdivision D of Division No. 6. It is located near the Trans-Canada Highway just northeast of the town of Norris Arm.

Demographics 

Government 
Norris Arm North is a local service district (LSD) that is governed by a committee responsible for the provision of certain services to the community. The chair of the LSD committee is Terri-Lynn Davis.

See also 
 List of communities in Newfoundland and Labrador
 List of designated places in Newfoundland and Labrador
 List of local service districts in Newfoundland and Labrador

References 

Designated places in Newfoundland and Labrador
Local service districts in Newfoundland and Labrador